William 'Bill' M. Killen (born November 5, 1938 in Olympia, Washington) was a Democratic member of the Idaho State Representative from 2006-2012.

Early life, education and career.
Killen earned his Bachelor's and Master's degrees in electrical engineering from Stanford University and earned his law degree from University of Idaho College of Law. He served on the city council McCall from 1994-1997 and a mayor from 1996–1997.

Elections

2010 
Killen was unopposed in the Democratic primary. Killen defeated Republican nominee Craig Thomas and Libertarian nominee Mikel Hautzinger with 56.7% of the vote.

2008 
Killen was unopposed in the Democratic primary. Killen defeated Libertarian nominee Mikel Haulzinger with 76.7% of the vote.

2006 
Killen was unopposed in the Democratic primary. Killen defeated incumbent Republican Kathie Garrett(who won in 2004 by 9 votes) and Constitution Party nominee Katherine Frazier.

References

External links
William M. Killen at the Idaho Legislature
 

1938 births
Living people
Idaho lawyers
Mayors of places in Idaho
Democratic Party members of the Idaho House of Representatives
People from Boise, Idaho
People from Olympia, Washington
People from McCall, Idaho
Stanford University alumni
United States Navy officers
University of Idaho alumni